Telecatch was a Brazilian professional wrestling TV program originally called Telecatch Montilla. It was broadcast by TV Globo from 1967 to 1969. The name of the program would later be changed to Os Reis do Ringue''' in the 1970s by RecordTV, which translates literally to "The Kings of the Ring". In 1965, TV Excelsior premiered the program with the name Telecatch Vulcan. For reasons of economy the chain of stores Imperatriz das Sedas (the main sponsor) and associated companies decided not to finance Telecatch and to definitively finish the program.

It was similar to American professional wrestling with its diverse and colorful ring performers and pre-determined outcomes. The formation of the show was the direct result of the public's shock at the brutality of vale tudo, which used to air on a TV show that originally aired in the time slot of Telecatch Montila. It was decided by the TV executives that a show with pre-determined outcomes should replace the unpredictable and brutal vale tudo show, thus the creation of televised professional wrestling in Brazil. Due to the popularity of the program, even today Telecatch is sometimes used as a synonym for pro wrestling.

An Italian-born Argentinian pro wrestler who went by the name of Ted Boy Marino signed on in 1967 and became the promotion's biggest star as a baby face. The show was a big success on the TV Excelsior and its run lasted until 1980.

In 2012, Telecatch was revived by the Brazilian Wrestling Federation (BWF) as the "BWF Telecatch" in attempts to revive professional wrestling in Brazil. A few years later, others companies such as FILL (International Luta Livre Federation), EWF (Extreme Wrestling Force) started to bring a similar product to the table. The most recent promotion is Action Pro Wrestling (APW), founded in 2018 with the objective to bring international learnings to the Telecatch tradition. Of those, only BWF and APW are broadcast by local television channels such as TV Garulhos and available at their YouTube channel.

Shortly after, many backyard promotions started to arise, mixing the Telecatch'' wrestling style with international wrestling. Some of them include FBWA (Araçoiaba Brazilian Wrestling Federation), PWC (Pro Wrestling Curitiba) and CFW (Crazy Freestyle Wrestling), all of them available at their respective YouTube channels.

See also
List of professional wrestling television series

References

Professional wrestling in Brazil
Professional wrestling television series